is a game for the PlayStation Portable handheld system. It was shown at Sony's PlayStation Meeting on the 22 July 2005. It involves the player spending time on a tropical island. The games clock is based on the PSP's internal clock, so if its day in the real world it will be day in the game world and if its night time it will be night time in the game. Other features include an alarm clock and also interaction with the objects in the game. For example, if you pick up a ukulele on the beach your PSP can then be used as a ukulele, the buttons being the chords and the analog pad is used to strum.  Thus far, the game has only been released in Japan.

External links
Official Portable Island website (Japanese)
Portable Island on IGN.com

2006 video games
Bandai Namco games
PlayStation Portable games
PlayStation Portable-only games
Japan-exclusive video games
Simulation video games
Video games developed in Japan